Philip van Dijk (9 August 1885 – 10 April 1937) was a Dutch footballer.

International career
He was part of the Netherlands national football team, playing 1 match on 16 October 1910 against Germany.

In later life he became a physician.

See also
 List of Dutch international footballers

References

External links
 

1885 births
1937 deaths
Footballers from Utrecht (city)
Association football midfielders
Dutch footballers
Netherlands international footballers
USV Hercules players